The Georgia Institute of Technology, commonly referred to as Georgia Tech or, in the state of Georgia, as Tech or The Institute, is a public research university and institute of technology in Atlanta, Georgia. Established in 1885, it is part of the University System of Georgia and has satellite campuses in Savannah, Georgia; Metz, France; Shenzhen, China; and Singapore. 

The school was founded as the Georgia School of Technology as part of Reconstruction plans to build an industrial economy in the post-Civil War Southern United States. Initially, it offered only a degree in mechanical engineering. By 1901, its curriculum had expanded to include electrical, civil, and chemical engineering. In 1948, the school changed its name to reflect its evolution from a trade school to a larger and more capable technical institute and research university. Today, Georgia Tech is organized into six colleges and contains about 31 departments/units, with emphasis on science and technology.

Student athletics, both organized and intramural, are a part of student and alumni life. The school's intercollegiate competitive sports teams, the four-time football national champion Yellow Jackets, and the nationally recognized fight song "Ramblin' Wreck from Georgia Tech", have helped keep Georgia Tech in the national spotlight. Georgia Tech fields eight men's and seven women's teams that compete in the NCAA Division I athletics and the Football Bowl Subdivision. Georgia Tech is a member of the Coastal Division in the Atlantic Coast Conference.

History

Establishment
 
The idea of a technology school in Georgia was introduced in 1865 during the Reconstruction period. Two former Confederate officers, Major John Fletcher Hanson (an industrialist) and Nathaniel Edwin Harris (a politician and eventually Governor of Georgia), who had become prominent citizens in the town of Macon, Georgia after the Civil War, strongly believed that the South needed to improve its technology to compete with the industrial revolution, which was occurring throughout the North. However, because the American South of that era was mainly populated by agricultural workers and few technical developments were occurring, a technology school was needed.

In 1882, the Georgia State Legislature authorized a committee, led by Harris, to visit the Northeast to see firsthand how technology schools worked. They were impressed by the polytechnic educational models developed at the Massachusetts Institute of Technology and the Worcester County Free Institute of Industrial Science (now Worcester Polytechnic Institute). The committee recommended adapting the Worcester model, which stressed a combination of "theory and practice", the "practice" component including student employment and production of consumer items to generate revenue for the school.

On October 13, 1885, Georgia Governor Henry D. McDaniel signed the bill to create and fund the new school. In 1887, Atlanta pioneer Richard Peters donated to the state  of the site of a failed garden suburb called Peters Park. The site was bounded on the south by North Avenue, and on the west by Cherry Street. He then sold five adjoining acres of land to the state for US$10,000,. This land was near Atlanta's northern city limits at the time of its founding, although the city has expanded several miles beyond it. A historical marker on the large hill in Central Campus notes the site occupied by the school's first buildings once held fortifications to protect Atlanta during the Atlanta Campaign of the American Civil War. The surrender of the city took place on the southwestern boundary of the modern Georgia Tech campus in 1864.

Early years

The Georgia School of Technology opened in the fall of 1888 with two buildings. One building (now Tech Tower, an administrative headquarters) had classrooms to teach students; The second building featured a shop and had a foundry, forge, boiler room, and engine room. It was designed for students to work and produce goods to sell and fund the school. The two buildings were equal in size to show the importance of teaching both the mind and the hands, though, at the time, there was some disagreement to whether the machine shop should have been used to turn a profit.

On October 20, 1905, U.S. President Theodore Roosevelt visited Georgia Tech. On the steps of Tech Tower, Roosevelt delivered a speech about the importance of technological education. He then shook hands with every student.

Georgia Tech's Evening School of Commerce began holding classes in 1912. The evening school admitted its first female student in 1917, although the state legislature did not officially authorize attendance by women until 1920. Annie T. Wise became the first female graduate in 1919 and was Georgia Tech's first female faculty member the following year. In 1931, the Board of Regents transferred control of the Evening School of Commerce to the University of Georgia (UGA) and moved the civil and electrical engineering courses at UGA to Tech. Tech replaced the commerce school with what later became the College of Business. The commerce school would later split from UGA and eventually become Georgia State University. In 1934, the Engineering Experiment Station (later known as the Georgia Tech Research Institute) was founded by W. Harry Vaughan with an initial budget of $5,000 and 13 part-time faculty. In the mid to late 40s, President Blake Van Leer had a focus on making Georgia Tech the "MIT of the South."  Van Leer lobbied government and business for funds for new facilities. The Research Building was expanded, and a $300,000 Westinghouse A-C network calculator was given to Georgia Tech by Georgia Power in 1947. A new $2,000,000 library was completed, new Textile and Architecture buildings completed and at the time the most modern gymnasium in the world was built.

Modern history
Founded as the Georgia School of Technology, Georgia Tech assumed its present name in 1948 to reflect a growing focus on advanced technological and scientific research. It is known as one of the three major prestigious institutes of technology in the United States along with the Massachusetts Institute of Technology in the northeast and the California Institute of Technology in the west. Unlike the similarly named institutions, the Georgia Institute of Technology is a public institution.

Under President Blake Ragsdale Van Leer's tenure, Tech went through a significant change, expanded its campus with new facilities, added new engineering courses, and became the largest engineering institute in the South and the third largest in the US. Van Leer also admitted the first female students to regular classes in 1952 and began steps toward integration.  He stood up to Georgia governor Marvin Griffin's demand to bar Bobby Grier from participating in the 1956 Sugar Bowl game between Georgia Tech and Grier's University of Pittsburgh. After Van Leer's death, his wife Ella Lillian Wall Van Leer bought a house on campus and opened it to female students to support their success. She also set up the first sorority on campus along with a Society of Women Engineers chapter.  In 1968 women could enroll in all programs at Tech. Industrial Management was the last program to open to women. The first women's dorm, Fulmer Hall, opened in 1969. Rena Faye Smith, appointed as a research assistant in the School of Physics in 1969 by Dr. Ray Young, in X-Ray Diffraction, became the first female faculty member (research) in the School of Physics. She went on to earn a Ph.D. at Georgia State University and taught physics and instructional technology at Black Hills State University – 1997–2005 as Rena Faye Norby. She served as a Fulbright Scholar in Russia 2004–2005. Women constituted 30.3% of the undergraduates and 25.3% of the graduate students enrolled in Spring 2009.

In 1959, a meeting of 2,741 students voted by an overwhelming majority to endorse integration of qualified applicants, regardless of race. Three years after the meeting, and one year after the University of Georgia's violent integration, Georgia Tech became the first university in the Deep South to desegregate without a court order. In the 1967–68 academic year 28 students out of 7,526 were black. In 1968, William Peace became the first black instructor and Marle Carter became the first black member of the homecoming court. In 1964, Dr. Calvin Huey became the first black player to play at Grant Field when he took the field for Navy. The first black person to play for Georgia Tech was Eddie McAshan in 1970.

In 1965 the university bought the former Pickrick Restaurant, a site of confrontation in the Civil Rights Movement, which it first used as a placement center. Later, it was known as the Ajax Building. The building was razed in 2009.

Similarly, there was little student reaction at Georgia Tech to the Vietnam War and United States involvement in the Cambodian Civil War. The student council defeated a resolution supporting the Vietnam Moratorium, and the extent of the Tech community's response to the Kent State shooting was limited to a student-organized memorial service, though the Institute was ordered closed for two days, along with all other University System of Georgia schools.

In 1988, President John Patrick Crecine pushed through a restructuring of the university. The Institute at that point had three colleges: the College of Engineering, the College of Management, and the catch-all COSALS, the College of Sciences and Liberal Arts. Crecine reorganized the latter two into the College of Computing, the College of Sciences, and the Ivan Allen College of Management, Policy, and International Affairs. Crecine never asked for input regarding the changes and, consequently, many faculty members disliked his top-down management style; despite this, the changes passed by a slim margin. Crecine was also instrumental in securing the 1996 Summer Olympics for Atlanta. A large amount of construction occurred, creating most of what is now considered "West Campus" for Tech to serve as the Olympic Village, and significantly gentrifying Midtown Atlanta. The Undergraduate Living Center, Fourth Street Apartments, Sixth Street Apartments, Eighth Street Apartments, Hemphill Apartments, and Center Street Apartments housed athletes and journalists. The Georgia Tech Aquatic Center was built for swimming events, and the Alexander Memorial Coliseum was renovated. The Institute also erected the Kessler Campanile and fountain to serve as a landmark and symbol of the Institute on television broadcasts.

In 1994, G. Wayne Clough became the first Tech alumnus to serve as the president of the Institute; he was in office during the 1996 Summer Olympics. In 1998, he separated the Ivan Allen College of Management, Policy, and International Affairs into the Ivan Allen College of Liberal Arts and returned the College of Management to "College" status (Crecine, the previous president, had demoted Management from "College" to "School" status as part of a controversial 1990 reorganization plan). His tenure focused on a dramatic expansion of the Institute, a revamped Undergraduate Research Opportunities Program, and the creation of an International Plan. On March 15, 2008, he was appointed secretary of the Smithsonian Institution, effective July 1, 2008. Dr. Gary Schuster, Tech's provost and executive vice president for Academic Affairs, was named interim president, effective July 1, 2008.

On April 1, 2009, G. P. "Bud" Peterson, previously the chancellor of the University of Colorado at Boulder, became the 11th president of Georgia Tech. On April 20, 2010, Georgia Tech was invited to join the Association of American Universities, the first new member institution in nine years. In 2014, Georgia Tech launched the first "massive online open degree" in computer science by partnering with Udacity and AT&T; a complete degree through that program costs students $7,000. It eventually expanded this program with its online masters in analytics in January 2017, as well as providing the option for advanced credits with a MicroMasters in collaboration with edX.

On January 7, 2019, President G.P. Bud Peterson announced his intention to retire. Angel Cabrera, former President of George Mason University and Georgia Tech alum, was named his successor on June 13, 2019. Cabrera took office on September 3, 2019.

Campus sections

The Georgia Tech campus is located in Midtown, an area slightly north of downtown Atlanta. Although a number of skyscrapers—most visibly the headquarters of The Coca-Cola Company, and Bank of America—are visible from all points on campus, the campus itself has few buildings over four stories and has a great deal of greenery. This gives it a distinctly suburban atmosphere quite different from other Atlanta campuses such as that of Georgia State University.

The campus is organized into four main parts: West Campus, East Campus, Central Campus, and Technology Square. West Campus and East Campus are both occupied primarily by student living complexes, while Central Campus is reserved primarily for teaching and research buildings.

West Campus

West Campus is occupied primarily by apartments and coed undergraduate dormitories. Apartments include Crecine, Center Street, 6th Street, Maulding, Graduate Living Center (GLC), and Eighth Street Apartments, while dorms include Freeman, Montag, Fitten, Folk, Caldwell, Armstrong, Hefner, Fulmer, and Woodruff Suites. The Campus Recreation Center (formerly the Student Athletic Complex); a volleyball court; a large, low natural green area known as the Burger Bowl; and a flat artificial green area known as the CRC (formerly SAC) Fields are all located on the western side of the campus. In 2017, West Village, a multipurpose facility featuring dining options, meeting space, School of Music classrooms, and offices to West Campus, opened.

The Robert C. Williams Paper Museum is located on West Campus.

West Campus was formerly home to Under the Couch, which relocated to the Student Center in the fall of 2010. Also within walking distance of West Campus are several late-night eateries. West Campus was home to a convenience store, West Side Market, which closed following the opening of West Village in the fall of 2017. Due to limited space, all auto travel proceeds via a network of one-way streets which connects West Campus to Ferst Drive, the main road of the campus. Woodruff Dining Hall, or "Woody's", was the West Campus Dining Hall,  before closing after the opening of West Village. It connected the Woodruff North and Woodruff South undergraduate dorms.

East Campus

East Campus houses all of the fraternities and sororities as well as most of the undergraduate freshman dormitories. East Campus abuts the Downtown Connector, granting residences quick access to Midtown and its businesses (for example, The Varsity) via a number of bridges over the highway. Georgia Tech football's home, Bobby Dodd Stadium is located on East Campus, as well as Georgia Tech basketball's home, McCamish Pavilion (formerly Alexander Memorial Coliseum).

Brittain Dining Hall is the main dining hall for East Campus. It is modeled after a medieval church, complete with carved columns and stained glass windows showing symbolic figures. The main road leading from East Campus to Central Campus is a steep ascending incline commonly known as "Freshman Hill" (in reference to the large number of freshman dorms near its foot). On March 8, 2007, the former Georgia State University Village apartments were transferred to Georgia Tech. Renamed North Avenue Apartments by the institute, they began housing students in the fall semester of 2007.

Central Campus

Central Campus is home to the majority of the academic, research, and administrative buildings. The Central Campus includes, among others: the Howey Physics Building; the Boggs Chemistry Building; the College of Computing Building; the Klaus Advanced Computing Building; the College of Design Building; the Skiles Classroom Building, which houses the School of Mathematics and the School of Literature, Media and Culture; the D. M. Smith Building, which houses the School of Public Policy; and the Ford Environmental Science & Technology Building. In 2005, the School of Modern Languages returned to the Swann Building, a 100-year-old former dormitory that now houses some of the most technology-equipped classrooms on campus. Intermingled with these are a variety of research facilities, such as the Centennial Research Building, the Microelectronics Research Center, the Neely Nuclear Research Center, the Nanotechnology Research Center, and the Petit Biotechnology Building.

Tech's administrative buildings, such as Tech Tower, and the Bursar's Office, are also located on the Central Campus, in the recently renovated Georgia Tech Historic District. The campus library, the Fred B. Wenn Student Center, and the Student Services Building ("Flag Building") are also located on Central Campus. The Student Center provides a variety of recreational and social functions for students including: a computer lab, a game room ("Tech Rec"), the Student Post Office, a music venue, a movie theater, the Food Court, plus meeting rooms for various clubs and organizations. Adjacent to the eastern entrance of the Student Center is the Kessler Campanile (which is referred to by students as "The Shaft"). The former Hightower Textile Engineering building was demolished in 2002 to create Yellow Jacket Park. More greenspace now occupies the area around the Kessler Campanile for a more aesthetically pleasing look, in accordance with the official Campus Master Plan. In August 2011, the G. Wayne Clough Undergraduate Learning Commons opened next to the library and occupies part of the Yellow Jacket Park area.

Technology Square

Technology Square, also known as "Tech Square", is located across the Downtown Connector and embedded in the city east of East Campus. Opened in August 2003 at a cost of $179 million, the district was built over run-down neighborhoods and has sparked a revitalization of the entire Midtown area. Connected by the recently renovated Fifth Street Bridge, it is a pedestrian-friendly area comprising Georgia Tech facilities and retail locations. One complex contains the College of Business Building, holding classrooms and office space for the Scheller College of Business, as well as the Georgia Tech Hotel and Conference Center and the Georgia Tech Global Learning Center. The Scheller College of Business is also home to three large glass chandeliers made by Dale Chihuly. This is one of the few locations of Chihuly's works found in the state of Georgia.

Another part of Tech Square, the privately owned Centergy One complex, contains the Technology Square Research Building (TSRB), holding faculty and graduate student offices for the College of Computing and the School of Electrical and Computer Engineering, as well as the GVU Center, a multidisciplinary technology research center. The Advanced Technology Development Center (ATDC) is a science and business incubator, run by the Georgia Institute of Technology, and is also headquartered in Technology Square's Centergy One complex.

Other Georgia Tech-affiliated buildings in the area host the Center for Quality Growth and Regional Development, the Georgia Tech Enterprise Innovation Institute, the Advanced Technology Development Center, VentureLab, the Georgia Electronics Design Center and the new CODA (mixed-use development). Technology Square also hosts a variety of restaurants and businesses, including the headquarters of notable consulting companies like Accenture and also including the official Institute bookstore, a Barnes & Noble bookstore, and a Georgia Tech-themed Waffle House.

Satellite campuses

In 1999, Georgia Tech began offering local degree programs to engineering students in Southeast Georgia, and in 2003 established a physical campus in Savannah, Georgia. Until 2013, Georgia Tech Savannah offered undergraduate and graduate programs in engineering in conjunction with Georgia Southern University, South Georgia College, Armstrong Atlantic State University, and Savannah State University. The university further collaborated with the National University of Singapore to set up The Logistics Institute–Asia Pacific in Singapore. The campus now serves the institute's hub for professional and continuing education and is home to the regional offices of the Georgia Tech Enterprise Innovation Institute, the Savannah Advanced Technology Development Center, and the Georgia Logistics Innovation Center.

Georgia Tech also operates a campus in Metz, in northeastern France, known as Georgia Tech Lorraine. Opened in October 1990, it offers master's-level courses in Electrical and Computer Engineering, Computer Science and Mechanical Engineering and Ph.D. coursework in Electrical and Computer Engineering and Mechanical Engineering. Georgia Tech Lorraine was the defendant in a lawsuit pertaining to the language used in advertisements, which was a violation of the Toubon Law.

The College of Design (formerly College of Architecture) maintains a small permanent presence in Paris in affiliation with the École d'architecture de Paris-La Villette and the College of Computing has a similar program with the Barcelona School of Informatics at the Polytechnic University of Catalonia in Barcelona, Spain. There are additional programs in Athlone, Ireland, Shanghai, China, and Singapore. Georgia Tech was supposed to have set up two campuses for research and graduate education in the cities of Visakhapatnam and Hyderabad, Telangana, India by 2010, but it appeared the plans had been set on hold . Alt URL 

Campus services
Georgia Tech Cable Network, or GTCN, is the college's branded cable source. Most non-original programming is obtained from Dish Network. GTCN currently has 100 standard-definition channels and 23 high-definition channels.

The Office of Information Technology, or OIT, manages most of the Institute's computing resources (and some related services such as campus telephones). With the exception of a few computer labs maintained by individual colleges, OIT is responsible for most of the computing facilities on campus. Student, faculty, and staff e-mail accounts are among its services. Georgia Tech's ResNet provides free technical support to all students and guests living in Georgia Tech's on-campus housing (excluding fraternities and sororities). ResNet is responsible for network, telephone, and television service, and most support is provided by part-time student employees.

Organization and administration

Georgia Tech's undergraduate and graduate programs are divided into six colleges. Collaboration among the colleges is frequent, as mandated by a number of interdisciplinary degree programs and research centers. Georgia Tech has sought to strengthen its undergraduate and graduate offerings in less technical fields, primarily those under the Ivan Allen College of Liberal Arts, which saw a 20% increase in admissions in 2008. Also, even in the Ivan Allen College, the Institute does not offer Bachelor of Arts  and Masters of Arts degrees, only Bachelor of Science and Master of Science degrees.  Georgia Tech's honors program is highly selective and designed to cater to the most intellectually curious undergraduates from all six colleges.

Funding
The Georgia Institute of Technology is a public institution that receives funds from the State of Georgia, tuition, fees, research grants, and alumni contributions. In 2014, the Institute's revenue amounted to about $1.422 billion. Fifteen percent came from state appropriations and grants while 20% originated from tuition and fees. Grants and contracts accounted for 55% of all revenue. Expenditures were about $1.36 billion. Forty-eight percent went to research and 19% went to instruction. The Georgia Tech Foundation runs the university's endowment and was incorporated in 1932. It includes several wholly owned subsidiaries that own land on campus or in Midtown and lease the land back to the Georgia Board of Regents and other companies and organizations. Assets totaled $1.882 billion and liabilities totaled $0.478 billion in 2014. As of 2007, Georgia Tech had the most generous alumni donor base, percentage wise, of any public university ranked in the top 50. In 2015, the university received a $30 million grant from Atlanta philanthropist Diana Blank to build the "most environmentally-sound building ever constructed in the Southeast."

Academics

Admissions

Undergraduate

The 2022 annual ranking of U.S. News & World Report categorizes Georgia Institute of Technology as "most selective." For the Class of 2025 (enrolled fall 2021), Georgia Tech received 45,388 applications and accepted 8,308 (18.3%). Of those accepted, 3,471 enrolled, a yield rate (the percentage of accepted students who choose to attend the university) of 41.8%. Of the 53% of the incoming freshman class who submitted SAT scores; the middle 50 percent Composite scores were 1370-1520. Of the 36% of enrolled freshmen in 2021 who submitted ACT scores; the middle 50 percent Composite score was between 31 and 35. Georgia Tech's freshman retention rate is 97.3%, with 92% going on to graduate within six years. In the 2020–2021 academic year, 95 freshman students were National Merit Scholars.

In 2017, Georgia Tech announced valedictorians and salutatorians from Georgia's accredited public and private high schools with 50 or more graduates will be the only students offered automatic undergraduate admission via its Georgia Tech Scholars Program.

Rankings

In 2021 U.S. News & World Report named Georgia Tech 3rd worldwide for both its Bachelor's in Analytics and Master of Science in Business Analytics degree programs. Also in the 2021 Times Higher Education subject rankings, Georgia Tech ranked 12th for engineering and 13th for computer science in the world.

Tech's undergraduate engineering program was ranked 4th in the United States and its graduate engineering program ranked 8th by U.S. News & World Report for 2021. Tech's graduate engineering program rankings are aerospace (4th), biomedical/bioengineering (2nd), chemical (tied for 5th), civil (tied for 3rd), computer (tied for 6th), electrical (tied for 6th), environmental (tied for 5th), industrial (1st), materials (9th), mechanical (tied for 5th), and nuclear (9th). Tech's undergraduate computer science program ranked 5th and its graduate computer science program ranked 8th.  Other graduate computer science program rankings are artificial intelligence (7th), theory (9th), systems (10th), and programming language (16th)

Also for 2021, U.S. News & World Report ranked Tech 4th in the United States for most innovative university.

Research

Facilities and classification

Georgia Tech is classified among "R1: Doctoral Universities – Very high research activity". Much of this research is funded by large corporations or governmental organizations. Research is organizationally under the Executive Vice President for Research, Stephen E. Cross, who reports directly to the institute president. Nine "interdisciplinary research institutes" report to him, with all research centers, laboratories and interdisciplinary research activities at Georgia Tech reporting through one of those institutes.

The oldest of those research institutes is a nonprofit research organization referred to as the Georgia Tech Research Institute (GTRI). GTRI provides sponsored research in a variety of technical specialties including radar, electro-optics, and materials engineering. Around forty percent (by award value) of Georgia Tech's research, especially government-funded classified work, is conducted through this counterpart organization. GTRI employs over 1,700 people and had $305 million in revenue in fiscal year 2014. The other institutes include: the Parker H. Petit Institute for Bioengineering & Bioscience, the Georgia Tech Institute for Electronics and Nanotechnology, the Georgia Tech Strategic Energy Institute, the Brook Byers Institute for Sustainable Systems, the Georgia Tech Manufacturing Institute, the Institute of Paper Science and Technology, Institute for Materials and the Institute for People and Technology.

Entrepreneurship
Many startup companies are produced through research conducted at Georgia Tech, with the Advanced Technology Development Center and VentureLab ready to assist Georgia Tech's researchers and entrepreneurs in organization and commercialization. The Georgia Tech Research Corporation serves as Georgia Tech's contract and technology licensing agency. Georgia Tech is ranked fourth for startup companies, eighth in patents, and eleventh in technology transfer by the Milken Institute.

Georgia Tech encourages undergraduates to participate in research alongside graduate students and faculty. The Undergraduate Research Opportunities Program awards scholarships each semester to undergraduates who pursue research activities. These scholarships, called the President's Undergraduate Research Awards, take the form of student salaries or help cover travel expenses when students present their work at professional meetings. Additionally, undergraduates may participate in research and write a thesis to earn a "Research Option" credit on their transcripts. An undergraduate research journal, The Tower, was established in 2007 to provide undergraduates with a venue for disseminating their research and a chance to become familiar with the academic publishing process.

Recent developments include a proposed graphene antenna.

Georgia Tech and Emory University have a strong research partnership and jointly administer the Emory-Georgia Tech Predictive Health Institute. They also, along with Peking University, administer the Wallace H. Coulter Department of Biomedical Engineering. In 2015,  Georgia Tech and Emory were awarded an $8.3 million grant by the National Institutes of Health (NIH) to establish a National Exposure Assessment Laboratory. In July 2015, Georgia Tech, Emory, and Children's Healthcare of Atlanta were awarded a four-year, $1.8 million grant by the Cystic Fibrosis Foundation in order to expand the Atlanta Cystic Fibrosis Research and Development Program. In 2015, the two universities received a five-year, $2.9 million grant from the National Science Foundation (NSF) to create new bachelor's, master's, and doctoral degree programs and concentrations in healthcare robotics, which will be the first program of its kind in the Southeastern United States.

The Georgia Tech Panama Logistics Innovation & Research Center is an initiative between the H. Milton Stewart School of Industrial and Systems Engineering, the Ecuador National Secretariat of Science and Technology, and the government of Panama that aims to enhance Panama's logistics capabilities and performance through a number of research and education initiatives. The center is creating models of country level logistics capabilities that will support the decision-making process for future investments and trade opportunities in the growing region  and has established dual degree programs in the University of Panama and other Panamanian universities with Georgia Tech. A similar center in Singapore, The Centre for Next Generation Logistics, was established in 2015 and is a collaboration between Georgia Tech and the National University of Singapore. The Center will work closely with government agencies and the industry to perform research in logistics and supply chain systems for translation into innovations and commercialization to achieve transformative economic and societal impact.

Industry connections
Georgia Tech maintains close ties to the industrial world. Many of these connections are made through Georgia Tech's cooperative education and internship programs. Georgia Tech's Division of Professional Practice (DoPP), established in 1912 as the Georgia Institute of Technology Cooperative Division, operates the largest and fourth-oldest cooperative education program in the United States, and is accredited by the Accreditation Council for Cooperative Education. The DoPP is charged with providing opportunities for students to gain real-world employment experience through four programs, each targeting a different body of students. The Undergraduate Cooperative Education Program is a five-year program in which undergraduate students alternating between semesters of formal instruction at Georgia Tech and semesters of full-time employment with their employers.

The Graduate Cooperative Education Program, established in 1983, is the largest such program in the United States. It allows graduate students pursuing master's degrees or doctorates in any field to spend a maximum of two consecutive semesters working full- or part-time with employers. The Undergraduate Professional Internship Program enables undergraduate students—typically juniors or seniors—to complete a one- or two-semester internship with employers. The Work Abroad Program hosts a variety of cooperative education and internship experiences for upperclassmen and graduate students seeking international employment and cross-cultural experiences. While all four programs are voluntary, they consistently attract high numbers of students—more than 3,000 at last count. Around 1,000 businesses and organizations hire these students, who collectively earn $20 million per year.

Georgia Tech's cooperative education and internship programs have been externally recognized for their strengths. The Undergraduate Cooperative Education was recognized by U.S. News & World Report as one of the top 10 "Programs that Really Work" for five consecutive years. U.S. News & World Report additionally ranked Georgia Tech's internship and cooperative education programs among 14 "Academic Programs to Look For" in 2006 and 2007. On June 4, 2007, the University of Cincinnati inducted Georgia Tech into its Cooperative Education Hall of Honor.

Student life

Georgia Tech students benefit from many Institute-sponsored or related events on campus, as well as a wide selection of cultural options in the surrounding district of Midtown Atlanta, "Atlanta's Heart of the Arts". Just off campus, students can choose from several restaurants, including a half-dozen in Technology Square alone. Home Park, a neighborhood that borders the north end of campus, is a popular living area for Tech students and recent graduates.

 Student demographics

As of fall 2021, the student body consists of more than 40,000 undergraduate and graduate students, with graduate students making up 60% of the student body. The student body at Georgia Tech is approximately 60% male and 40% female.

Underrepresented groups enrollment is slowly increasing due to Tech valuing diversity and inclusion.  Tech's growing liberal arts programs, more holistic review of all applicants, and outreach programs encouraging them to consider careers in STEM are effectively improving their presence on campus.

Around 50–55% of all Georgia Tech students are residents of the state of Georgia, around 20% come from outside the U.S., and 25–30% are residents of other U.S. states or territories. The top states of origin for all non-Georgia U.S. students are Florida, Texas, California, North Carolina, Virginia, New Jersey, and Maryland. Students at Tech represent all 50 states and 114 countries.  The top three countries of origin for all international students are China, India, and South Korea.

Housing

Georgia Tech Housing is subject to a clear geographic division of campus into eastern and western areas that contain the vast majority of housing. East Campus is largely populated by freshmen and is served by Brittain Dining Hall and North Avenue Dining Hall. West Campus houses some freshmen, transfer, and returning students (upperclassmen), and is served by West Village. Graduate students typically live off-campus (for example, in Home Park) or on-campus in the Graduate Living Center or 10th and Home.

The Institute's administration has implemented programs in an effort to reduce the levels of stress and anxiety felt by Tech students. The Familiarization and Adaptation to the Surroundings and Environs of Tech (FASET) Orientation and Freshman Experience (a freshman-only dorm life program to "encourage friendships and a feeling of social involvement") programs, which seek to help acclimate new students to their surroundings and foster a greater sense of community. As a result, the Institute's retention rates improved.

In recent years , Georgia Tech Housing has been at or over capacity. In Fall 2006, many dorms housed "triples", which was a project that put three residents into a two-person room. At the time, certain pieces of furniture were not provided to the third resident in order to accommodate a third bed. When spaces became available in other parts of campus, the third resident was moved elsewhere. In 2013, Georgia Tech provided housing for 9,553 students, and housing was 98% occupied.

In the fall of 2007, the North Avenue Apartments were opened to Tech students. Originally built for the 1996 Olympics and belonging to Georgia State University, the buildings were given to Georgia Tech and have been used to accommodate Tech's expanding population. Georgia Tech freshmen students were the first to inhabit the dormitories in the Winter and Spring 1996 quarters, while much of East Campus was under renovation for the Olympics. The North Avenue Apartments (commonly known as "North Ave") are also noted as the first Georgia Tech buildings to rise above the top of Tech Tower. Open to second-year undergraduate students and above, the buildings are located on East Campus, across North Avenue and near Bobby Dodd Stadium, putting more upperclassmen on East Campus. In 2008, the North Avenue Apartments East and North buildings underwent extensive renovation to the façade. During their construction, the bricks were not all properly secured and thus were a safety hazard to pedestrians and vehicles on the Downtown Connector below.

Two programs on campus as well have houses on East Campus: the International House (commonly referred to as the I-House); and Women, Science, and Technology. The I-House is housed in 4th Street East and Hayes. Women, Science, and Technology is housed in Goldin and Stein. The I-House hosts an International Coffee Hour every Monday night that class is in session from 6 to 7 pm, hosting both residents and their guests for discussions.

Single graduate students may live in the Graduate Living Center (GLC) or at 10th and Home. 10th and Home is the designated family housing unit of Georgia Tech. Residents are zoned to Atlanta Public Schools. Residents are zoned to Centennial Place Elementary, Inman Middle School, and Midtown High School.

Student clubs and activities
Several extracurricular activities are available to students, including over 500 student organizations overseen by the Center for Student Engagement. The Student Government Association (SGA), Georgia Tech's student government, has separate executive, legislative, and judicial branches for undergraduate and graduate students. One of the SGA's primary duties is the disbursement of funds to student organizations in need of financial assistance. These funds are derived from the Student Activity Fee that all Georgia Tech students must pay, currently $123 per semester. The ANAK Society, a secret society and honor society established at Georgia Tech in 1908, claims responsibility for founding many of Georgia Tech's earliest traditions and oldest student organizations, including the SGA.

Arts

Georgia Tech's Music Department was established as part of the school's General College in 1963 under the leadership of Ben Logan Sisk. In 1976, the Music Department was assigned to the College of Sciences & Liberal Studies, and in 1991 it was relocated to its current home in the College of Design. In 2009, it was reorganized into the School of Music. The Georgia Tech Glee Club, founded in 1906, is one of the oldest student organizations on campus, and still operates today as part of the School of Music. The Glee Club was among the first collegiate choral groups to release a recording of their songs. The group has toured extensively and appeared on The Ed Sullivan Show twice, providing worldwide exposure to "Ramblin' Wreck from Georgia Tech". Today, the modern Glee Club performs dozens of times each semester for many different events, including official Georgia Tech ceremonies, banquets, and sporting events. It consists of 40 to 60 members and requires no audition or previous choral experience.

The Georgia Tech Band Program, also in the School of Music, represents Georgia Tech at athletic events and provides Tech students with a musical outlet. It was founded in 1908 by 14 students and Robert "Biddy" Bidez. The marching band consistently fields over 300 members. Members of the marching band travel to every football game.

The School of Music is also home to a number of ensembles, such as the 80-to-90-member Symphony Orchestra, Jazz Ensemble, Concert Band, and Percussion and MIDI Ensembles. Students also can opt to form their own small Chamber Ensembles, either for course credit or independently. The contemporary Sonic Generator group, backed by the GVU and in collaboration with the Center for Music Technology, performs a diverse lineup of music featuring new technologies and recent composers.

Georgia Tech also has a music scene that is made up of groups that operate independently from the Music Department. These groups include four student-led a cappella groups: Nothin' but Treble, Sympathetic Vibrations, Taal Tadka, and Infinite Harmony. Musician's Network, another student-led group, operates Under the Couch, a live music venue and recording facility that was formerly located beneath the Couch Building on West Campus and is now located in the Student Center.

Many music, theatre, dance, and opera performances are held in the Ferst Center for the Arts. DramaTech is the campus' student-run theater. The theater has been entertaining Georgia Tech and the surrounding community since 1947. They are also home to Let's Try This! (the campus improv troupe) and VarietyTech (a song and dance troupe). Momocon is an annual anime/gaming/comics convention held on campus in March hosted by Anime O-Tekku, the Georgia Tech anime club. The convention has free admission and was held in the Student Center, Instructional Center, and surrounding outdoor areas until 2010. Beginning in 2011, the convention moved its venue to locations in Technology Square.

Student media

WREK is Georgia Tech's student run radio station. Broadcast at 91.1 MHz on the FM band the station is known as "Wrek Radio". The studio is on the second floor of the Student Center Commons. Broadcasting with 100 kW ERP, WREK is among the nation's most powerful college radio stations. WREK is a student operated and run radio station. In April 2007, a debate was held regarding the future of the radio station. The prospective purchasers were GPB and NPR. WREK maintained its independence after dismissing the notion with approval from the Radio Communications Board of Georgia Tech. The Georgia Tech Amateur Radio Club, founded in 1912, is among the oldest collegiate amateur radio clubs in the nation. The club provided emergency radio communications during several disasters including numerous hurricanes and the 1985 Mexico earthquake.The Technique, also known as the "Nique", is Tech's official student newspaper. It is distributed weekly during the Fall and Spring semesters (on Fridays), and biweekly during the Summer semester (with certain exceptions). It was established on November 17, 1911. Blueprint is Tech's yearbook, established in 1908. Other student publications include The North Avenue Review, Tech's "free-speech magazine", Erato, Tech's literary magazine, The Tower, Tech's undergraduate research journal and T-Book, the student handbook detailing Tech traditions. The offices of all student publications are located in the Student Services Building.

Greek life

Greek life at Georgia Tech includes over 50 active chapters of social fraternities and sororities. All of the groups are chapters of national organizations, including members of the North American Interfraternity Conference, National Panhellenic Conference, and National Pan-Hellenic Council. The first fraternity to establish a chapter at Georgia Tech was Alpha Tau Omega in 1888, before the school held its first classes. The first sorority to establish a chapter was Alpha Xi Delta in 1954. In 2019, 28% of undergraduate men and 33% of undergraduate women were active in Tech's Greek system.

Athletics

Georgia Tech teams are variously known as the Yellow Jackets, the Ramblin' Wreck and the Engineers; but the official nickname is Yellow Jackets. They compete as a member of the National Collegiate Athletic Association (NCAA) Division I level (Football Bowl Subdivision (FBS) sub-level for football), primarily competing in the Atlantic Coast Conference (ACC) for all sports since the 1979–80 season (a year after they officially joined the conference before beginning conference play), Coastal Division in any sports split into a divisional format since the 2005–06 season. The Yellow Jackets previously competed as a charter member of the Metro Conference from 1975–76 to 1977–78, as a charter member of the Southeastern Conference (SEC) from 1932–33 to 1963–64, as a charter of the Southern Conference (SoCon) from 1921–22 to 1931–32, and as a charter member of the Southern Intercollegiate Athletic Association (SIAA) from 1895–96 to 1920–21. They also competed as an Independent from 1964–65 to 1974–75 and on the 1978–79 season. Men's sports include baseball, basketball, cross country, football, golf, swimming & diving, cheerleading, tennis and track & field; while women's sports include basketball, cross country, softball, swimming and diving, tennis, track & field, cheerleading, and volleyball. Their cheerleading squad has, in the past, only competed the National Cheerleaders & Dance Association (NCA & NDA) College Nationals along with Buzz and the Goldrush dance team competing here as well. However, in the 2022 season, Goldrush competed at the Universal Cheerleaders & Dance Association (UCA & UDA) College Nationals for the first time and in 2023 the cheer team will compete here for the first time as well.

The Institute mascots are Buzz and the Ramblin' Wreck. The Institute's traditional football rival is the University of Georgia; the rivalry is considered one of the fiercest in college football. The rivalry is commonly referred to as Clean, Old-Fashioned Hate, which is also the title of a book about the subject. There is also a long-standing rivalry with Clemson. Tech has eighteen varsity sports: football, women's and men's basketball, baseball, softball, volleyball, golf, men's and women's tennis, men's and women's swimming and diving, men's and women's track and field, men's and women's cross country, and coed cheerleading. Four Georgia Tech football teams were selected as national champions in news polls: 1917, 1928, 1952, and 1990. In May 2007, the women's tennis team won the NCAA National Championship with a 4–2 victory over UCLA, the first ever national title granted by the NCAA to Tech.

Fight songs
Tech's fight song "I'm a Ramblin' Wreck from Georgia Tech" is known worldwide. First published in the 1908 Blue Print, it was adapted from an old drinking song ("Son of a Gambolier") and embellished with trumpet flourishes by Frank Roman. Then-Vice President Richard Nixon and Soviet Premier Nikita Khrushchev sang the song together when they met in Moscow in 1958 to reduce the tension between them. As the story goes, Nixon did not know any Russian songs, but Khrushchev knew that one American song as it had been sung on The Ed Sullivan Show.

"I'm a Ramblin' Wreck" has had many other notable moments in its history. It is reportedly the first school song to have been played in space. Gregory Peck sang the song while strumming a ukulele in the movie The Man in the Gray Flannel Suit. John Wayne whistled it in The High and the Mighty. Tim Holt's character sings a few bars of it in the movie His Kind of Woman. There are numerous stories of commanding officers in Higgins boats crossing the English Channel on the morning of D-Day leading their men in the song to calm their nerves. It is played after every Georgia Tech score in a football game.

Another popular fight song is "Up With the White and Gold", which is usually played by the band preceding "Ramblin' Wreck". First published in 1919, "Up with the White and Gold" was also written by Frank Roman. The song's title refers to Georgia Tech's school colors and its lyrics contain the phrase, "Down with the Red and Black", an explicit reference to the school colors of the University of Georgia and the then-budding Georgia Tech–UGA rivalry.

Club sports
Georgia Tech participates in many non-NCAA sanctioned club sports, including archery, airsoft, boxing, crew, cricket, cycling (winning three consecutive Dirty South Collegiate Cycling Conference mountain bike championships), disc golf, equestrian, fencing, field hockey, gymnastics, ice hockey, kayaking, lacrosse, paintball, roller hockey, soccer, rugby union, sailing, skydiving, swimming, table tennis, triathlon, ultimate, water polo, water ski, and wrestling. Many club sports take place at the Georgia Tech Aquatic Center, where swimming, diving, water polo, and the swimming portion of the modern pentathlon competitions for the 1996 Summer Olympics were held. In 2018, the first annual College Club Swimming national championship meet was held at the McAuley Aquatic Center and the hosts, the Georgia Tech Swim Club, were crowned the first-ever club swimming and diving national champions.

Traditions

Georgia Tech has a number of legends and traditions, some of which have persisted for decades. Some are well-known; for example, the most notable of these is the popular but rare tradition of stealing the 'T' from Tech Tower. Tech Tower, Tech's historic primary administrative building, has the letters "TECH" hanging atop it on each of its four sides. There have been several attempts by students to orchestrate complex plans to steal the huge symbolic letter T, and on occasion they have carried this act out successfully.

One of the cherished holdovers from Tech's early years, a steam whistle blew five minutes before the hour, every hour from 7:55 a.m. to 5:55 p.m.[162] However, starting in the fall semester of 2017, due to a new classroom scheduling template, the whistle no longer adheres to this convention and follows a modified schedule.[163] The whistle also blows every spring during the "When the Whistle Blows" remembrance ceremony.[164] The faculty newspaper is named The Whistle.[63]

School colors
Georgia Tech students hold a heated, long and ongoing rivalry with the University of Georgia, known as Clean, Old-Fashioned Hate. The first known hostilities between the two institutions trace back to 1891. The University of Georgia's literary magazine proclaimed UGA's colors to be "old gold, black, and crimson". Dr. Charles H. Herty, then President of the University of Georgia, felt that old gold was too similar to yellow and that it "symbolized cowardice". After the 1893 football game against Tech, Herty removed old gold as an official color. Tech would first use old gold for their uniforms, as a proverbial slap in the face to UGA, in their first unofficial football game against Auburn in 1891. Georgia Tech's school colors would henceforth be old gold and white.

In April 2018 Georgia Tech went through a comprehensive brand redefinement solidifying the school colors into Tech Gold and White as the primary school colors while Navy Blue serves as the contrasting secondary color. The decision to move forward with gold, white and blue is rooted in history, as the first mention of official Georgia Tech class colors came in the Atlanta Constitution in 1891 (white, blue and gold) and the first GT class ring in 1894 also featured gold, white and blue.

Mascots

 Costumed in plush to look like a yellow jacket, the official mascot of Georgia Tech is Buzz. Buzz enters the football games at the sound of swarming yellow jackets and proceeds to do a flip on the fifty-yard line GT logo. He then bull rushes the goal post and has been known to knock it out of alignment before football games. Buzz is also notorious for crowd surfing and general light-hearted trickery amongst Tech and rival fans.

The Ramblin' Wreck was the first official mascot of Georgia Tech. It is a 1930 Ford Model A Sports Coupe. The Wreck has led the football team onto the field every home game since 1961. The Wreck features a gold and white paint job, two gold flags emblazoned with the words "To Hell With Georgia" and "Give 'Em Hell Tech", and a white soft top. The Wreck is maintained by the Ramblin' Reck Club, a selective student leadership organization on campus.

Spirit organizations

The Ramblin' Reck Club is charged with upholding all school traditions and creating new traditions such as the SWARM. The SWARM is a 900-member spirit group seated along the north end zone or on the court at basketball games. This is the group that typically features body painting, organized chants, and general fanaticism.

The marching band that performs at halftime and after big plays during the football season is clad in all white and sits next to SWARM at football games providing a dichotomy of white and gold in the North End Zone. The band is also the primary student organization on campus that upholds the tradition of RAT caps, wherein band freshman wear the traditional yellow cap at all band events.

Fight songs and chants
The band plays the fight songs Ramblin' Wreck from Georgia Tech and Up With the White and Gold after every football score and between every basketball period. At the end of a rendition of either fight song, there is a series of drum beats followed by the cheer "Go Jackets" three times (each time followed by a second cheer of "bust their ass"), then a different drum beat and the cheer "Fight, Win, Drink, Get Naked!" The official cheer only includes "Fight, Win" but most present other than the band and cheerleaders will yell the extended version.

It is also tradition for the band to play the "When You Say Budweiser" after the third quarter of football and during the second-to-last official timeout of every basketball game. During the "Budweiser Song", all of the fans in the stadium alternate bending their knees and standing up straight. Other notable band songs are Michael Jackson's Thriller for half-time at the Thrillerdome, Ludacris' Move Bitch'' for large gains in football. Another popular chant is called the Good Word and it begins with asking, "What's the Good Word?" The response from all Tech faithful is, "To Hell With Georgia." The same question is asked three times and then the followup is asked, "How 'bout them dogs?" And everyone yells, "Piss on 'em."

Notable people

There are many notable graduates, non-graduate former students and current students of Georgia Tech. Georgia Tech alumni are known as Yellow Jackets. According to the Georgia Tech Alumni Association:

The first class of 95 students entered Georgia Tech in 1888, and the first two graduates received their degrees in 1890. Since then, the institute has greatly expanded, with an enrollment of 14,558 undergraduates and 6,913 postgraduate students .

Many distinguished individuals once called Georgia Tech home, the most notable being Jimmy Carter, former President of the United States and Nobel Peace Prize winner, who briefly attended Georgia Tech in the early 1940s before matriculating at and graduating from the United States Naval Academy. Juan Carlos Varela, a 1985 industrial engineering graduate, was elected president of Panama in May 2014. Another Georgia Tech graduate and Nobel Prize winner, Kary Mullis, received the Nobel Prize in Chemistry in 1993. A large number of businesspeople (including but not limited to prominent CEOs and directors) began their careers at Georgia Tech. Some of the most successful of these are Charles "Garry" Betty (CEO Earthlink), David Dorman (CEO AT&T Corporation), Mike Duke (CEO Wal-Mart), David C. Garrett Jr. (CEO Delta Air Lines), and James D. Robinson III (CEO American Express and later director of The Coca-Cola Company).

Tech graduates have been deeply influential in politics, military service, and activism. Atlanta mayor Ivan Allen Jr. and former United States Senator Sam Nunn have both made significant changes from within their elected offices. Former Georgia Tech President G. Wayne Clough was also a Tech graduate, the first Tech alumnus to serve in that position. Many notable military commanders are alumni; James A. Winnefeld, Jr. who served as the ninth Vice Chairman of the Joint Chiefs of Staff, Philip M. Breedlove who served as the Commander, U.S. Air Forces in Europe, William L. Ball was the 67th Secretary of the Navy, John M. Brown III was the Commander of the United States Army Pacific Command, and Leonard Wood was Chief of Staff of the Army and a Medal of Honor recipient for helping capture of the Apache chief Geronimo. Wood was also Tech's first football coach and (simultaneously) the team captain, and was instrumental in Tech's first-ever football victory in a game against the University of Georgia. Thomas McGuire was the second-highest scoring American ace during World War II and a Medal of Honor recipient.

Numerous astronauts and National Aeronautics and Space Administration (NASA) administrators spent time at Tech; most notably, Retired Vice Admiral Richard H. Truly was the eighth administrator of NASA, and later served as the president of the Georgia Tech Research Institute. John Young walked on the Moon as the commander of Apollo 16, first commander of the Space Shuttle and is the only person to have piloted four different classes of spacecraft. Georgia Tech has its fair share of noteworthy engineers, scientists, and inventors. Herbert Saffir developed the Saffir-Simpson Hurricane Scale, and W. Jason Morgan made significant contributions to the theory of plate tectonics and geodynamics. In computer science, Andy Hunt co-wrote The Pragmatic Programmer and an original signatory of The Agile Manifesto, Krishna Bharat developed Google News, and D. Richard Hipp developed SQLite. Architect Michael Arad designed the World Trade Center Memorial in New York City.

Despite their highly technical backgrounds, Tech graduates are no strangers to the arts or athletic competition. Among them, comedian/actor Jeff Foxworthy of Blue Collar Comedy Tour fame and Randolph Scott both called Tech home. Several famous athletes have, as well; about 150 Tech students have gone into the National Football League (NFL), with many others going into the National Basketball Association (NBA) or Major League Baseball (MLB). Well-known American football athletes include all-time greats such as Joe Hamilton, Pat Swilling, Billy Shaw, and Joe Guyon, former Tech head football coaches Pepper Rodgers and Bill Fulcher, and recent students such as Calvin Johnson and Tashard Choice. Some of Tech's recent entrants into the NBA include Josh Okogie, Chris Bosh, Derrick Favors, Thaddeus Young, Jarrett Jack, and Iman Shumpert. Award-winning baseball stars include Kevin Brown, Mark Teixeira, Nomar Garciaparra, and Jason Varitek. In golf, Tech alumni include the legendary Bobby Jones, who founded The Masters, and David Duval, who was ranked the No. 1 golfer in the world in 1999.

See also 
List of colleges and universities in metropolitan Atlanta

Notes

References

Further reading

External links

 
 Georgia Tech Athletics website

 
Universities and colleges in Atlanta
Educational institutions established in 1885
Engineering universities and colleges in Georgia (U.S. state)
Midtown Atlanta
Technological universities in the United States
Universities and colleges accredited by the Southern Association of Colleges and Schools
Georgia Tech
1885 establishments in Georgia (U.S. state)